National Route A006 is a gravel road of  connecting the town of Las Cuevas on the northwest of the province of Mendoza with the Christ the Redeemer monument in the border between Argentina and Chile. This road is only open in the summer season. It is always important to inquire in the cities of Mendoza or Uspallata on the road conditions as it could be impassable at times.

Before the construction of the Cristo Redentor Tunnel, the road was the only border crossing between the two countries in this area.

National roads in Mendoza Province
Tourism in Argentina
Gravel roads